The Partry Mountains is a mountain range in County Mayo on the west coast of Ireland.

Geography 
The highest peak in the Partry Mountains is Maumtrasna which rises to (682m / 2,238ft). The mountain range overlooks Lough Mask.

References 
Listing at mountainviews.ie

Mountains and hills of County Mayo